Eriogonum is a genus of flowering plants in the family Polygonaceae. The genus is found in North America and is known as wild buckwheat.  This is a highly species-rich genus, and indications are that active speciation is continuing.  It includes some common wildflowers such as the California buckwheat (Eriogonum fasciculatum).

The genus derived its name from the Greek word erion meaning 'wool' and gonu meaning 'knee or joint'. The author of the genus, Michaux, explained the name as describing the first named species of the genus (E. tomentosum) as a wooly plant with sharply bent stems ("planta lanata, geniculata"). Despite sharing the common name "buckwheat", Eriogonum is part of a different genus than the cultivated European buckwheat and than other plant species also called wild buckwheat.

It came into the news in 2005 when the Mount Diablo buckwheat (Eriogonum truncatum, believed to be extinct) was rediscovered.

Ecology

Eriogonum species are used as food plants by the larvae of some Lepidoptera (butterflies and moths). An example of a butterfly that uses this plant for food is the Lycaena heteronea. Several of these are monophagous, meaning their caterpillars only feed on this genus, sometimes just on a single taxon of Eriogonum. Wild buckwheat flowers are also an important source of food for these and other Lepidoptera. In some cases, the relationship is so close that Eriogonum and dependent Lepidoptera are in danger of coextinction.

Monophagous Lepidoptera on wild buckwheat include:
 Apodemia mormo (Mormon metalmark) – feeds exclusively on Eriogonum
 Apodemia mormo langei (Lange's metalmark) – only known from Eriogonum nudum ssp. auriculatum
 Chionodes dammersi – feeds exclusively on Eriogonum
 Chionodes luteogeminatus – only known from Eriogonum niveum
 Euphilotes enoptes smithi (Smith's blue butterfly) – only known from Eriogonum latifolium and Eriogonum parvifolium
 Euphilotes battoides allyni (El Segundo blue butterfly) - only known from Eriogonum parvifolium
Additionally, bees of the sagebrush steppe rely on the nectar of desert buckwheats, and birds and rodents eat the seeds.

Uses
Some varieties of eriogonum, such as California buckwheat were and still are used as medicinal and food crops by Native American tribes.

Selected species

 Eriogonum abertianum – Abert's buckwheat
 Eriogonum alatum – winged buckwheat
 Eriogonum alexanderae
 Eriogonum aliquantum – Cimarron buckwheat
 Eriogonum alpinum – trinity buckwheat
 Eriogonum ampullaceum – mono buckwheat
 Eriogonum androsaceum – rock-jasmine buckwheat
 Eriogonum angulosum – anglestem buckwheat
 Eriogonum apiculatum – San Jacinto buckwheat
 Eriogonum apricum – Ione buckwheat
 Eriogonum arborescens – Santa Cruz Island buckwheat
 Eriogonum argillosum – clay buckwheat
 Eriogonum argophyllum – Sulphur Hot Springs buckwheat, Ruby Valley buckwheat
 Eriogonum baileyi – Bailey's buckwheat
 Eriogonum brachyanthum – shortflower buckwheat
 Eriogonum brachypodum – Parry's buckwheat
 Eriogonum brandegeei – Brandegee's buckwheat
 Eriogonum breedlovei – Paiute buckwheat
 Eriogonum brevicaule – shortstem buckwheat
 Eriogonum butterworthianum – Butterworth's buckwheat
 Eriogonum caespitosum – matted buckwheat
 Eriogonum calcareum
 Eriogonum callistum – Tehachapi buckwheat
 Eriogonum cedrorum – The Cedars buckwheat
 Eriogonum cernuum – nodding buckwheat
 Eriogonum cinereum – ashyleaf buckwheat, coastal buckwheat
 Eriogonum cithariforme – Cithara buckwheat
 Eriogonum codium – basalt desert buckwheat
 Eriogonum coloradense – Colorado buckwheat
 Eriogonum compositum – arrowleaf buckwheat
 Eriogonum congdonii – Congdon's buckwheat
 Eriogonum contiguum – Reveal's buckwheat
 Eriogonum corymbosum – crispleaf buckwheat
 Eriogonum corymbosum var. nilesii – Nile's wild buckwheat, Las Vegas buckwheat
 Eriogonum covilleanum – Coville's buckwheat
 Eriogonum crocatum – conejo buckwheat or saffron buckwheat
 Eriogonum crosbyae – Crosby's buckwheat
 Eriogonum cusickii – Cusick's buckwheat
 Eriogonum dasyanthemum – chaparral buckwheat
 Eriogonum davidsonii – Davidson's buckwheat
 Eriogonum deflexum – flatcrown buckwheat
 Eriogonum deserticola – Colorado Desert buckwheat
 Eriogonum diatomaceum – Churchill Narrows buckwheat
 Eriogonum diclinum – Jaynes Canyon buckwheat
 Eriogonum domitum
 Eriogonum douglasii – Douglas buckwheat
 Eriogonum elatum – tall woolly buckwheat
 Eriogonum encelioides – Encelia buckwheat
 Eriogonum eremicola – Telescope Peak buckwheat
 Eriogonum evanidum – vanishing wild buckwheat
 Eriogonum exilifolium – dropleaf buckwheat
 Eriogonum fasciculatum – California buckwheat
 Eriogonum flavum – yellow buckwheat
 Eriogonum giganteum – Saint Catherine's lace
 Eriogonum giganteum var. compactum – Santa Barbara Island buckwheat
 Eriogonum gilmanii – Gilman's buckwheat

 Eriogonum gossypinum – cottony buckwheat
 Eriogonum gracile – slender woolly buckwheat
 Eriogonum gracilipes – White Mountain buckwheat, raspberry buckwheat
 Eriogonum gracillimum – rose and white buckwheat
 Eriogonum grande – redflower buckwheat
 Eriogonum gypsophilum – gypsum wild buckwheat
 Eriogonum heermannii – Heermann's buckwheat
 Eriogonum helichrysoides – Strawflower wild buckwheat
 Eriogonum heracleoides – parsnip-flower Buckwheat
 Eriogonum hirtellum – Klamath Mountain Buckwheat
 Eriogonum hoffmannii – Hoffmann's buckwheat
 Eriogonum hookeri – Hooker's buckwheat
 Eriogonum incanum – frosted buckwheat
 Eriogonum inflatum – desert trumpet, bladderstem, Indian pipe-weed
 Eriogonum intrafractum – napkinring, jointed buckwheat
 Eriogonum jamesii – James' buckwheat
 Eriogonum kelloggii – red mountain buckwheat

 Eriogonum kennedyi – Kennedy's buckwheat
 Eriogonum latens – Inyo buckwheat
 Eriogonum latifolium – seaside buckwheat
 Eriogonum libertini – Dubakella Mountain buckwheat
 Eriogonum lobbii – Lobb's buckwheat
 Eriogonum longifolium – longleaf buckwheat
 Eriogonum longifolium var. harperi – Harper's umbrella plant or Harper's buckwheat
 Eriogonum longifolium var. gnaphalifolium – scrub buckwheat or long-leaf wild Buckwheat
 Eriogonum longifolium var. longifolium – longleaf buckwheat
 Eriogonum longifolium var. lindheimeri – Lindheimer's long-leaf Eriogonum or Lindheimer's buckwheat

 Eriogonum luteolum – goldencarpet buckwheat
 Eriogonum maculatum – spotted buckwheat
 Eriogonum marifolium – marumleaf buckwheat
 Eriogonum microthecum – slender buckwheat
 Eriogonum mohavense – Western Mojave buckwheat
 Eriogonum molestum – pineland buckwheat
 Eriogonum nervulosum – Snow Mountain buckwheat
 Eriogonum nidularium – birdnest buckwheat
 Eriogonum niveum – snow buckwheat
 Eriogonum nortonii – pinnacles buckwheat
 Eriogonum nudum – naked buckwheat
 Eriogonum nudum ssp. auriculatum

 Eriogonum nummulare – Kearney buckwheat, money buckwheat
 Eriogonum ochrocephalum – whitewoolly buckwheat
 Eriogonum ovalifolium – cushion buckwheat, oval-leaf buckwheat
 Eriogonum palmerianum – Palmer's buckwheat
 Eriogonum panamintense – Panamint Mountain buckwheat
 Eriogonum parishii – mountainmist
 Eriogonum parvifolium – coast buckwheat, dune buckwheat or cliff buckwheat
 Eriogonum pauciflorum – Fewflower buckwheat
 Eriogonum pelinophilum – clay-loving wild buckwheat
 Eriogonum pendulum – waldo buckwheat
 Eriogonum plumatella – yucca buckwheat
 Eriogonum prattenianum – Nevada City buckwheat
 Eriogonum prociduum – prostrate buckwheat

 Eriogonum pusillum – yellowturbans
 Eriogonum pyrolifolium – pyrola-leaved buckwheat
 Eriogonum reniforme – kidneyleaf buckwheat
 Eriogonum rixfordii – pagoda buckwheat
 Eriogonum rosense – rosy buckwheat, mountain rose buckwheat
 Eriogonum rosense var. beatleyae – Beatley's buckwheat
 Eriogonum roseum – wand buckwheat
 Eriogonum salicornioides – glasswort buckwheat
 Eriogonum saxatile – hoary buckwheat
 Eriogonum shockleyi – cowpie buckwheat

 Eriogonum siskiyouense – Siskiyou buckwheat
 Eriogonum soredium – Frisco buckwheat
 Eriogonum spectabile – Barron's buckwheat
 Eriogonum spergulinum – spurry buckwheat
 Eriogonum sphaerocephalum – rock buckwheat
 Eriogonum strictum – blue mountain buckwheat
 Eriogonum ternatum – ternate buckwheat
 Eriogonum tiehmii – Tiehm's buckwheat
 Eriogonum thomasii – Thomas' buckwheat
 Eriogonum thurberi – Thurber's buckwheat
 Eriogonum thymoides – thymeleaf buckwheat
 Eriogonum tomentosum – dogtongue wild buckwheat
 Eriogonum trichopes – little desert trumpet

 Eriogonum tripodum – tripod buckwheat
 Eriogonum truncatum – Mount Diablo buckwheat
 Eriogonum umbellatum – sulphurflower buckwheat
 Eriogonum ursinum – talus buckwheat, Bear Valley buckwheat
 Eriogonum vimineum – wickerstem buckwheat
 Eriogonum viridescens – twotooth buckwheat
 Eriogonum visheri – Dakota wild buckwheat, Visher's buckwheat
 Eriogonum wrightii – bastardsage
 Eriogonum zapatoense
 Eriogonum zionis  –  Zion buckwheat

References

External links
 Genus treatment in the Jepson Manual
 Mt. Diablo buckwheat rediscovered

 
Polygonaceae genera